Okanagan Mountain Provincial Park is a provincial park within the Okanagan-Similkameen Regional District of British Columbia, Canada, focused on the mountain of the same name and located on the east side of Okanagan Lake, opposite Peachland and immediately south of the City of Kelowna. The park is one of the largest in the area, covering . Most of the park is only accessible by foot, horseback, bicycle, or boat as motor vehicle access is restricted to BC Parks staff and technicians servicing the three telecommunications towers in the park.

The park comprises several trails, campsites (including six marine camp areas), lakes, and large areas of wilderness. Popular activities include hiking, camping, boating, mountain biking, and hunting (which is permitted).

Wildlife

The rugged rocky terrain is habitat for mountain goats, white-tailed deer, moose, elk, lynx, and marten. Coyote are also found in the park. Small but very important species are the blue listed western harvest mouse, Nuttall's cottontail (the furthest northerly occurrence) and spotted bat.

The northern alligator lizard and western skink can be found under rocks or bark in open wooded areas while the yellow-bellied racer prefers grasslands and open fields.
Other reptile species found in the park include western painted turtle, rubber boa, gopher snake, western blue racer and western rattlesnake.

The park protects habitat for bird species including the western grebe and white-headed woodpecker.

Wildfire

In 2003, a wildfire started in the park near Rattlesnake Island and spread quickly, eventually burning most of the park. The burned trees and other fire-related hazards posed an extreme danger and the park was closed. In 2005, the park was reopened after much cleanup work, though many burned trees still are a significant danger.

Images

References

External links
BC Parks information page
Okanagan Mountain Park Wildfire - Grade 6 Student Perspective

Provincial parks of British Columbia
Provincial parks in the Okanagan
1973 establishments in British Columbia
Protected areas established in 1973
Articles containing video clips